Ultrasonic impact treatment (UIT) is a metallurgical processing technique, similar to work hardening, in which ultrasonic energy is applied to a metal object.  This technique is part of the High Frequency Mechanical Impact (HFMI) processes. Other acronyms are also equivalent: Ultrasonic Needle Peening (UNP), Ultrasonic Peening (UP). Ultrasonic impact treatment can result in controlled residual compressive stress, grain refinement and grain size reduction. Low and high cycle fatigue are enhanced and have been documented to provide increases up to ten times greater than non-UIT specimens.

Theory 
In UIT, ultrasonic waves are produced by an electro-mechanical ultrasonic transducer, and applied to a workpiece.  An acoustically tuned resonator bar is caused to vibrate by energizing it with a magnetostrictive or Piezoelectric ultrasonic transducer.  The energy generated from these high frequency impulses is imparted to the treated surface through the contact of specially designed steel pins. These transfer pins are free to move axially between the resonant body and the treated surface.

When the tool, made up of the ultrasonic transducer, pins and other components, comes into contact with the work piece it acoustically couples with the work piece, creating harmonic resonance. This harmonic resonance is performed at a carefully calibrated frequency, to which metals respond very favorably, resulting in compressive residual stress, stress relief and grain structure improvements.

Depending on the desired effects of treatment a combination of different frequencies and displacement amplitude is applied.

Application 
UIT is highly controllable. Incorporating a programmable logic controller (PLC) or a Digital Ultrasonic Generator, the frequency and amplitude of UIT are easily set and maintained, thus removing a significant portion of operator dependency. UIT can also be mechanically controlled, thus providing repeatability of results from one application to the next. Examples of mechanical control employed with UIT include:

CNC milling machines
Lathes
Robotic control
Weld tractors

With these types of controlled applications, the surface finish of the work piece is highly controllable.

For many applications, UIT is most effectively employed by hand. The high portability of the UIT system enables travel to austere locations and hard to reach places. The flexibility that is facilitated by variations in the tool configuration (such as angle-peening-head) ensures that access to very tight locations is possible.

UIT's effectiveness has been illustrated on the following metals, among others:
Aluminium (including sensitized Aluminium)
Bronze
Cobalt alloys
Nickel alloys
Steels
Carbon steel
Stainless steel
High-strength low-alloy steel
Manganese steel
Titanium

History 
UIT was originally developed in 1972 and has since been perfected by a team of Russian scientists under the leadership of Dr. Efim Statnikov. Originally developed and utilized to enhance the fatigue and corrosion attributes of ship and submarine structures, UIT has been utilized in aerospace, mining, offshore drilling, shipbuilding, infrastructure, automotive, energy production and other industries.
Different industrial solutions exist nowadays and are commercialized by a limited number of Original Equipment Manufacturers worldwide.

Practical applications 
UIT enables life extension of steel bridges. This technique has been employed in numerous US states as well as other nations. The result is a greatly reduced cost of infrastructure. UIT has been certified for this use by AASHTO.

The use of UIT on draglines and other heavy equipment in the mining industry has resulted in increased production and has decreased downtime and maintenance costs.

UIT is employed on drive shafts and crank shafts in a number of industries. Results show that UIT increases shaft life by over a factor of 3.

The US Navy uses UIT to address cracked areas in certain aluminum decks. Without UIT, crack repairs resulted in almost immediate re-cracking. With UIT, repairs have shown to last over eight months without cracks.

See also 
High frequency impact treatment
Corrosion fatigue
Stress corrosion cracking
Welding

References

Further reading
Fisher, J.W., E.Sh. Statnikov, L. Tehini, Fatigue Strength Enhancement by Means of Weld Design Change and the Application of Ultrasonic Impact treatment, Proc. of Intl. Symp. On Steel Bridges, Chicago (2001).
Haagensen, P.J., Weld Improvement Methods – Applications and Implementations in Design Codes, invited paper at the Conference on Fatigue of Welded Structures, Senlis, Paris, France, 12–14 June 1996.
Prokopenko, G.I., T.A. Lyatun, Study of Surface Hardening Conditions by Means of Ultrasound, in: Physics and Chemistry of Material Processing, No. 3, p 91, 1977.
Blaha, F., B.Langenecker.“Dehnung von Zink-Kristallen unter Ultraschalleinwirkung”, Zeitschrift die Naturwissenschaften, 20, 556, 1955.
Konovalov, E.G., V.M. Drozdov, M.D. Tyavlovski, Dynamic Strength of Metals (in Russian), Nauka i Tekhnika, Minsk, 1969.
Kazantsev, V.F., Basic Physics of Ultrasonic Action on Solid Body Processing (in Russian). Doctoral thesis, AKIN, Moscow, 1980, pp. 12–44.
Statnikov, E.S., Development and Study of Ultrasonic Specific-purpose Devices, Thesis, Academician N.N. Andreyev Acoustic Institute, Academy of Sciences of the USSR, 1982.
Severdenko, V.P., E.G. Konovalov, E.Sh. Statnikov et al., Study of Mechanical Properties of New Materials under Ultrasonic Oscillations, Report # 21-971, FTI Acad. Nauk of BSSR,Minsk (1966).
Statnikov, E.Sh., Activation of Deformation Process under Ultrasonic Effect,. Scientific and Technical Conference “XXX Lomonosov Readings”, Sevmashvtuz, Severodvinsk (2001).

IIW PUBLICATIONS:

 Increasing the Fatigue Strength of Welded Joints in Cyclic Compression. 47th Annual Assembly of the International Institute of Welding. IIW Doc. XIII-1569-94, Peking, 1994. Y. Kudryavtzev, V.I. Tryufyakov, P.P. Mikheev, E. S. Statnikov.
 Improvement of Fatigue Strength of Welded Joint (in High Strength Steels and Aluminium Alloys) by Means of Ultrasonic Hammer Peening. 48th Annual Assembly of the International Institute of Welding. IIW Doc. XIII-1594-95, Stockholm, 1995. J.J. Janosch, H. Koneczny, S. Debiez, E. S. Statnikov, V.I. Tryufyakov, P.P. Mikheev.
 Ultrasonic Impact Treatment of Welded Joints. 48th Annual Assembly of the International Institute of Welding. IIW Doc. XIII-1609-95, Stockholm, 1995. V.I. Trufyakov, P.P. Mikheev, Yu. Kudryavtzev, E. S. Statnikov.
 Specification for Weld Toe Improvement by Means of Ultrasonic Impact Treatment. 49th Annual Assembly of the International Institute of Welding. IIW Doc. XIII-1617-96, Budapest, 1996.  E. S. Statnikov, V.I. Trufyakov, P.P. Mikheev Yu. Kudryavtzev.
 Ultrasonic Impact Treatment (UIT) of Welded Joints. 49th Annual Assembly of the International Institute of Welding, Budapest, 1996., E. S. Statnikov.
 Applications of Operational Ultrasonic Impact Treatment (UIT) Technology in Production of Welded Joints. 50th Annual Assembly of the International Institute of Welding. IIW Doc. XIII-1667-97, San-Francisco, 1997. E.S. Statnikov.
 Comparison of Efficiency and Processibility of Post-Weld Deformation Methods for Increase in Fatigue Strength of Welded Joints. 50th Annual Assembly of the International Institute of Welding. IIW Doc. XIII-1668-97, San-Francisco, 1997. E. S. Statnikov.
 The Efficiency of Ultrasonic Impact Treatment (UIT) for Improving the Fatigue Strength of Welded Joints. 51stAnnual Assembly of the International Institute of Welding. IIW Doc. XIII-1745-98, Hamburg, 1998. 	V.I. Troufyakov, E.S. Statnikov, P.P. Mikheev, A.Z. Kuzmenko.
 Introductory Fatigue Tests on Welded Joints in High Strength Steel and Aluminium Treated by Various Improvement Methods Including Ultrasonic Impact Treatment (UIT). 51st Annual Assembly of the International Institute of Welding. IIW Doc. XIII-1748-98, Hamburg, 1998. P.J. Haagensen, E.S. Statnikov, L. Lopez-Martinez.
 Repair of Fatigue Cracks. Working Group 5. 51st Annual Assembly of the International Institute of Welding. IIW Doc. XIII-WG5-18-98, Hamburg, 1998. E.S. Statnikov, L. Kelner, J. Baker, H. Croft, V.I. Dvoretsky, V.O. Muktepavel.
 Guide for Application of Ultrasonic Impact Treatment Improving Fatigue Life of Welded Structures. 52nd Annual Assembly of the International Institute of Welding. IIW Doc. XIII-1757-99, Lisbon, 1999. E.S. Statnikov.
 Comparison of Ultrasonic Impact Treatment (UIT) and other Fatigue Life Improvement Methods. 53rd Annual Assembly of the International Institute of Welding. IIW-Doc. XIII-1817-00, Florence, 2000. E.S. Statnikov, V.O. Muktepavel, A. Blomqvist.
 Repair of Fatigue Welded Structures Repair Case Study. Working Group 5. 54th Annual Assembly of the International Institute of Welding. IIW Doc. XIII-WG5-1873-01, Slovenia, 2001. E.S. Statnikov, L. Tehini.
 Fatigue Strength Improvement of Bridge Girders by Ultrasonic Impact Treatment (UIT). 55th Annual Assembly of the International Institute of Welding. IIW Doc.XIII-1916-02, Copenhagen, 2002. J.W. Fisher, E.S. Statnikov, L. Tehini.
 Comparison of the Improvement in Corrosion Fatigue Strength of Weld Repaired Marine Cu 3-grade Bronze Propellers by Ultrasonic Impact Treatment (UIT) or Heat Treatment. 56th Annual Assembly of the International Institute of Welding. IIW. Doc. XIII-1964-03, Bucharest, 2003. E.S. Statnikov, V.O. Muktepavel, V.N. Vityazev, V.I. Trufyakov, V.S. Kovalchuk, P. Haagensen.
 The influence of ultrasonic impact treatment on fatigue behaviour of welded joints in high strength steel. 56th Annual Assembly of the International Institute of Welding, IIW-Doc. XIII-1976-03, Bucharest, 2003.  André Galtier, E.S. Statnikov.
 Fatigue strength of a longitudinal attachment improved by ultrasonic impact treatment. 56th Annual Assembly of the International Institute of Welding. IIW. Doc.XIII-1990-03, Bucharest, 2003. Veli-Matti Lihavainen, Gary Marquis, E.S. Statnikov.
 Physics and Mechanism of Ultrasonic Impact Treatment. 57th Annual Assembly of the International Institute of Welding. IIW Doc. XIII-2004-04, Osaka, 2004, E. S. Statnikov.
 Comparison of the Efficiency of 27, 36 and 44 kHz UIT Tools. 57th Annual Assembly of the International Institute of Welding. IIW Doc. XIII-2005, Osaka, 2004. E.S. Statnikov, V.N. Vityazev, O.V. Korolkov.
 Improvement in Quality and Reliability of Structures by Means of UIT Esonix. 58th Annual Assembly of the International Institute of Welding. IIW Doc. XIII-2049-05, Prague, 2005.  E. S. Statnikov.
 Ultrasonic Impact Treatment versus Ultrasonic Peening. 58th Annual Assembly of the International Institute of Welding. IIW Doc. XIII-2050-05. Prague, 2005. E. S. Statnikov.
 Physics and Mechanism of Ultrasonic Impact. 59th Annual Assembly of the International Institute of Welding. IIW Doc. XIII-2096-06, Quebec, 2006. E .S. Statnikov, O.V. Korolkov, V.N.Vityazev.
 On the Assessment of Ultrasonic Impact Treatment Effect on Fatigue (Discussion of some experimental results). 59th Annual Assembly of the International Institute of Welding. IIW Doc. XIII-2097-06, Quebec, 2006. E. S. Statnikov, V.Y. Korostel.
 Development of Esonix Ultrasonic Impact Treatment Techniques. 59th Annual Assembly of the International Institute of Welding. IIW Doc. XIII-2098-06, Quebec, 2006. E.S. Statnikov, V.Y. Korostel, N.Vekshin, G. Marquis.
 Fatigue Strength Improvement of Thin Stainless Steel Specimens by UIT. 59th Annual Assembly of the International Institute of Welding. IIW Doc. XIII-2104-06, Quebec, 2006.  L Huhtala, V-M Lihavainen, G Marquis, E. S. Statnikov, V.Y. Korostel, S.J. Maddox.
 On the Use of Ultrasound to Accelerate Fatigue Testing. 59th Annual Assembly of the International Institute of Welding. IIW Doc. XIII-2106-06, Quebec, 2006. E.S. Statnikov, V.Y. Korostel.
 UIT Application for Angular Distortion Compensation in Welded T-joints. 59th Annual Assembly of the International Institute of Welding. IIW Doc. XIII-2107-06, Quebec, 2006. E.S. Statnikov, V.Y. Korostel, W. Fricke.
 On Identify in UIT Preparation for Comparative Testing and Field Application. 60th Annual Assembly of the International Institute of Welding. IIW Doc. XIII-2180-07, Dubrovnik, 2007. E.S. Statnikov, V.Y. Korostel, A.D. Manelik.
 The use of ultrasound to accelerate fatigue testing during assessment of the UIT effectiveness. 60th Annual Assembly of the International Institute of Welding. IIW Doc. XIII-2182-07, Dubrovnik, 2007. E.S. Statnikov, V.Y. Korostel.
 UIT application for angular distortion compensation in welded T-joints. 60th Annual Assembly of the International Institute of Welding. IIW Doc. X-1603-07, Dubrovnik, 2007. E.S. Statnikov, Wolfgang Fricke.
 Inventing Ultrasonic Impact Technology and its Industry Impact.  63rd Annual Assembly of the International Institute of Welding, IIW Doc. XIII-2320-10, Istanbul, 2010.  L. Kelner, D. Sharman.

External links
http://www.appliedultrasonics.com/pdf/pdf8.pdf
http://www.appliedultrasonics.com/pdf/pdf2.pdf
http://www.sonats-et.com/page_23-needle-peening.html

Corrosion prevention
Metallurgical processes
Metalworking
Welding